Russell William Zimmer (born February 26, 1926) was an American politician in the state of Wyoming. He served in the Wyoming State Senate and Wyoming House of Representatives as a member of the Republican Party.

He served as President of the Wyoming Senate from 1989 to 1991. He worked in the grain and livestock business.

References

1926 births
Possibly living people
People from Scotts Bluff County, Nebraska
Presidents of the Wyoming Senate
Republican Party Wyoming state senators
Republican Party members of the Wyoming House of Representatives